The Inventor: Out for Blood in Silicon Valley is a 2019 American documentary film, directed and produced by Alex Gibney.  The film revolves around Elizabeth Holmes and her former company Theranos. It is considered a companion piece to the book, Bad Blood: Secrets and Lies in a Silicon Valley Startup.

Out for Blood had its world premiere at the Sundance Film Festival on January 24, 2019. It was produced by HBO Documentary Films and Jigsaw Productions with a television premiere on March 18, 2019 on HBO as well as its streaming platforms.

Overview
Out for Blood chronicles the rise and fall of Theranos, interspersed with footage of Holmes and her COO Sunny Balwani making grandiose proclamations about Theranos and the value it was providing. It also includes visual flashbacks to the era of Thomas Edison, the titular Inventor who famously failed repeatedly before finally succeeding; Theranos's miniature blood testing labs were called "Edisons". Notably, Gibney chronicles how Holmes and Balwani were seemingly more interested in marketing, promotion, naming, and managing the media than in the actual mechanics of their technology working, in negative feedback from medical experts, or in investigating and responding to the allegations in John Carreyrou's article detailing practices at the company. Gibney also shows how Holmes and Balwani seemed to believe that any criticism must be a plot from their blood-testing competitors Quest Diagnostics and LabCorp to the point of hiring personal bodyguards and leading chants against Quest at employee morale events. Footage is also shown of the parade of wealthy and powerful figures Theranos lured onto their side, whether as investors, consultants, or members of the Board of Directors, such as David Boies, George P. Shultz, Henry Kissinger, Sam Nunn, Bill Frist, and James Mattis.

People interviewed in the film include:
 Erika Cheung and Tyler Shultz, two whistleblowers who brought down Theranos despite being extremely junior employees fresh out of college. Cheung and Shultz discussed how the company buried error reports and considered pushback against impossible demands from Holmes as signs of not being a "team player". Cheung wrote a letter to the clinical regulator CMS, and Shultz provided crucial information for John Carreyrou's article.
 Dan Ariely, a professor of psychology, who discusses potential reasons why Holmes could have given such barefaced lies to the media and her colleagues about how her company operated.
 Roger Parloff, a writer and editor of Fortune magazine who wrote a glowing front cover article on Theranos in 2014 as well as a follow-up article in 2015 on Holmes's deceptions.
 Ken Auletta, a journalist with The New Yorker who wrote an article on Holmes in 2014.
 John Carreyrou, a journalist with The Wall Street Journal who read Auletta's work in The New Yorker, investigated Theranos's practices and wrote the influential article that accused Theranos of massive misrepresentation of what their company was offering, and helped bring government regulators to turn on Theranos.
 Phyllis Gardner, a Stanford professor of medicine who was highly skeptical of then-student Holmes's plans in 2002, as well as a member of the Harvard Medical School Board of Fellows to which Holmes was nominated as a peer.
 Rochelle Gibbons, the widow of Ian Gibbons, Theranos's chief biochemist. Ian Gibbons did much of the work behind the patents filed by Holmes, told Holmes about problems with the technology and was rebuffed, and died by suicide in 2013.
 Cheryl Gafner, Dave Phillipides, Douglas Matje, Ryan Wistort, Tony Nugent, Matt Hernan, and Patrick O'Neill, employees at Theranos.
 Tim Draper, an investor in Theranos.
 Channing Robertson, an advisor to Theranos.
 Serena Stewart, a phlebotomy trainer who trained employees at the Theranos Wellness Centers set up by Walgreens in Arizona.
 Stephanie Seitz, an ND who discussed the problems with people interpreting and ordering their own labwork, as well as problems with Theranos's inconsistent results in Arizona.

Production
The documentary was announced to the public in May 2018.  Alex Gibney would direct the film, with Gibney, Erin Edeiken and Jessie Deeter, serving as producers on the film, while HBO Documentary Films and Jigsaw Productions would produce the film and HBO distributing.  Holmes declined to participate in the film, and so the documentary used footage of her shot by Errol Morris and other filmed appearances.

Release
The film had its world premiere at the Sundance Film Festival on January 24, 2019. It was released on March 18, 2019, by HBO.

Reception
The documentary received mostly positive reviews. The site's critics' consensus reads: "Alex Gibney's The Inventor declines to outright condemn the actions by Theranos founder Elizabeth Holmes, but instead provides a comprehensive overview of the scandal that allows viewers to mull over its implications towards the broader Silicon Valley."

Ed Power of The Daily Telegraph gave the film a score of 4/5 stars, saying that it "was a devastating warning of where these unchecked messianic tendencies lead and the lives they can destroy along the way." Brian Lowry of CNN described the film as "part thriller, part tale of corporate whistleblowers and perhaps foremost, a warning of how an apparent fraudster spouting tech jargon can bedazzle people who really should know better". Eric Deggans of NPR wrote: "[Gibney] shows how Holmes and her supporters pushed the limits of Silicon Valley's culture of risk-taking and overpromising until they created a house of cards that collapsed under close scrutiny."

Some criticisms have been brought up regarding certain elements in the film. Emily Yoshida of Vulture criticized the documentary's focus: "The Inventor ultimately can’t decide if it’s about the specific, contained absurdities of the Theranos scam, or the phenomenology of scams like Theranos." Tasha Robinson of The Verge praised Gibney's ability to make complex ideas accessible but also criticized that the film "feels a little empty." Conversely, Rachel Syme of The New Yorker praised the film's look at the "vexingly sphinxlike" Holmes.

The film was also criticized for presenting naturopath Stephanie Seitz as a physician and as a "spokesperson for the medical community".

Gibney won the Writers Guild of America Award for Best Documentary Screenplay at the 72nd Writers Guild of America Awards for his screenplay, earning Gibney a record fourth award in this category.

References

External links
 

2019 films
American documentary films
HBO documentary films
Films directed by Alex Gibney
2010s English-language films
2010s American films